The Constitution of Apatzingán, formally Decreto Constitucional para la Libertad de la América Mexicana ("Constitutional Decree for the Liberty of Mexican America"), was promulgated on October 22, 1814 by the Congress of Anahuac gathered in the city of Apatzingán because of the persecution of the troops of Félix María Calleja. The constitution was valid for insurgent forces in the territories that it controlled during the Mexican War of Independence.

Background 
After the death of the Roman Catholic priest and revolutionary leader, Miguel Hidalgo y Costilla, on June 28, 1813, José María Morelos from Acapulco made a call to create a Congress in September in the city of Chilpancingo (now in the state of Guerrero), whose purpose was to create an independent government. Proclaimed as Supreme National Congress, was installed on September 14, 1813; that same day Morelos announced to the Assembly a program called Sentimientos de la Nación, in which was declared the independence of the Mexican America and establish a government of popular representation with division of powers, forbade slavery and the division of population into castes. On 6 November, same year, the Congress signed the first official document of independence, known as the Solemn Act of the Declaration of Independence of Northern America.

Content 
Constitution of Apatzingán was composed of 2 titles and 242 articles, was based on the same principles that the Constitution of Cádiz but in a modified form, as opposed to the Spanish constitution, provided the establishment of the republican system of government. The most relevant articles were:

1. The Catholic, apostolic and Roman religion, is the only to be profess by the State
2. The power to make laws and establish the form of government that best serves the interests of society, is the sovereignty.
5. Therefore, the sovereignty resides originally in the people, and its exercise in the national representation composed of deputies elected by the citizens in the form prescribed by the constitution.
12. These three powers, legislative, executive and judicial, must not be exercised not by one person, or by a single corporation.
13. Are deemed citizens of this America all born here.
19. The law must be equal for all...
30. Every citizen is deemed innocent until declared guilty.
42. (The provinces of the Mexican America): Mexico, Puebla, Tlaxcala, Veracruz, Yucatan, Oaxaca, Técpan, Michoacán, Queretaro, Guadalajara, Guanajuato, Potosí, Zacatecas, Durango, Sonora, Coahuila and Nuevo Reino de Leon.

The Supreme Government, (Executive), was composed of three persons, they would have equal authority and responsibility; same as the government would exercise as an alternative every four months. Their most direct authority, in addition to the executive and administrative nature, were to ensure the protection of the rights of citizens: liberty, property, equality and security. The Supreme Government would be exercised by José María Cos, José María Liceaga and José María Morelos.

The Constitution of Apatzingán never really entered into force. Almost a year after it was enacted, his inspiring, José María Morelos y Pavón was imprisoned and was shot on December 22, 1815. So temporary, the royalist troops returned to take control of most of the country, but ultimately could not prevent the Mexican America independence were to be consummated, first as the Mexican Empire that later became the United Mexican States.

See also
Congress of Chilpancingo
Solemn Act of the Declaration of Independence of Northern America
Constitutions of Mexico
Federal Constitution of the United Mexican States of 1824
Federal Constitution of the United Mexican States of 1857
Political Constitution of the United Mexican States of 1917 (currently in force)
Mexican War of Independence
Jose Maria Morelos
Miguel Hidalgo y Costilla
History of democracy in Mexico

References

Constitutions of Mexico
Mexican War of Independence
Constitution of Mexico
Defunct constitutions
Independent Mexico
Legal history of Mexico
1814 documents